Because You're Mine is a 1952 musical comedy film.

Because You're Mine may also refer to:

 "Because You're Mine" (song), a song from the film, performed by Mario Lanza, also covered by Nat King Cole
 "Because You're Mine", a song by Chanté Moore, with BeBe Winans, from Precious
Because You're Mine, a 1997 novel by Lisa Kleypas